Lothbeg is a hamlet south of helmsdale.

Lothbeg is a small coastal hamlet, on the coast of the North Sea eastern Sutherland, Scottish Highlands and is in the Scottish council area of Highland.
The main Edinburgh to Thurso A9 road runs through Lothbeg. The village of Brora is 4 miles southwest along the A9.

The meaning is "little marsh". Loth "marsh" Beag "little".

References

Populated places in Sutherland